Ida Maria Børli Sivertsen (born 13 July 1984), better known simply as Ida Maria, is a Norwegian musician and songwriter.

Biography

Early life
Maria was born and raised in Nesna. She taught herself to play guitar and began performing at local concerts at age 14.

Career
Maria gained considerable success in Norway in 2007 after winning two national competitions for unknown artists - Zoom urørt 2006 and Urørtkonkurransen 2007 - and playing successful shows at the annual Norwegian music industry festival By:Larm 2007 and 2008. In 2007, Maria released her first singles "Oh My God", "Drive Away My Heart", "Stella" and "Queen of the World".

Her debut album, Fortress Round My Heart, was released on 28 July 2008 and reached #5 in the Norwegians record chart, #38 on the Irish Albums Chart and #39 on the UK Albums Chart. The single, "I Like You So Much Better When You're Naked", entered the UK Singles Chart at #18 on downloads alone in July 2008 and peaked at #13. It also reached #18 in the Norwegian singles chart. In August 2008 the song entered the Irish Singles Chart at #34. The song was also featured on Triple J's Hottest 100 of 2008 in Australia. A deluxe version of her debut album containing unreleased tracks was released in February 2009. Fortress Round My Heart was finally released in the United States in March 2009 with "I Like You So Much Better When You're Naked" appearing on the Hot Modern Rock Tracks chart in April 2009. In July 2009, "Oh My God", Maria's debut single in 2007, was re-released as a single along with a music video. In September 2009, a remix version and music video for "Oh My God" featuring punk rock icon Iggy Pop singing backing vocals was released.

Having performed at various festivals, including the Glastonbury Festival  and Reading festival, and being nominated for Best Rock/Indie Artist category at the BT Digital Music Awards 2008, Ida Maria has toured in Scandinavia, the UK, the United States and Australia. She performed her song "I Like You So Much Better When You're Naked" on The Tonight Show with Jay Leno in 2009.

Her second album, Katla, was released in Norway on 8 November 2010 (where it reached #14 on the album chart) and eventually in the United States in July 2011. and internationally on 7 June 2011.

Her third studio album, Love Conquers All, was released in August 2013 and was followed in February 2014 by her first EP release, Accidental Happiness.

Scandalize My Name, her fourth album, was released on 18 April 2016 and consists of a collection of American spirituals.

She competed in the Melodi Grand Prix 2018, attempting to represent Norway in the Eurovision Song Contest 2018 with the song 'Scandilove'. Her song was not one of the four songs that progressed to the Gold Final, and was eliminated.

Maria will release the 5 song EP, Dirty Money, in June 2021.

Soundtracks

Maria's song "Queen Of The World" was used as the outro for season 3 episode 1 of The Inbetweeners.

Maria's song "I Like You So Much Better When You're Naked" was used in episode 8 of My Life As Liz entitled "A Prom to Remember Part 2". It was played during the dancing sequence at the prom. The song was also included in the soundtrack of the film Lesbian Vampire Killers. Her song "Louie" is being used for some commercials for the FX TV show Louie. It was again used as the inspiration for the title of episode 12, season 6 of Grey's Anatomy

The song "Oh My God" was one of the first songs announced to be used in Rock Band 3.

Maria's song "Keep Me Warm" was used in the season 4 finale of the ABC drama Grey's Anatomy and during some Nivea commercials during fall 2009. It has also been used in the UK drama show Skins, in series 4, episode 1.

Maria's song "Oh My God" was in the trailer for It's Kind of a Funny Story and The Virginity Hit.

Maria was one of the co-headliners of the 2009 Perez Hilton Presents tour. On 17 September 2009, after a Boston show, she pulled out of the tour, citing exhaustion.

Her song "Bad Karma" from Katla was used in the 2011 film Scream 4 and episodes of Gossip Girl, Teen Wolf, Royal Pains and Being Human together with the song "Quite Nice People", both from the album Katla.

Ida Maria's song "Oh My God" was used in a Finnish film, Sisko tahtoisin jäädä (Sister, I wanted to stay), released in 2010.

Ida Maria's song "Oh My God" was also used in American Netflix show, Big Mouth Season 2 Episode 2, released in 2018.

The song "Cold Blooded" has been featured on the soundtracks for the Melissa McCarthy comedy Spy and the musical drama Jem and the Holograms.

The song "I eat boys like you for breakfast" was used in the first episode of Season 10 of Jenter (Girls), a Norwegian TV and web series directed at children and teenagers on NRK Super.

The song “Devil” is featured on the trailer for Vampyr.

Collaborations
In 2007, Maria sang vocals for the track "I Love You, You Imbecile" by Pelle Carlberg.

In 2008, she sang backing vocals for the track "Words" on Guillemots' album Red.

In 2009, she collaborated with the Norwegian band DeLillos for the track "Flink" on their album Huskeglemme.

Maria has collaborated with the Norwegian rapper Joddski on two occasions, first on the track "Sannhetsserum" on his 2010 album Krig & Kjærlighet, and secondly on the track "Hold Ut" on is 2011 album Bensin På Bålet.

In 2012, she did a duet with Anthony Green for the track "Can't Be Satisfied" on his 2012 album Beautiful Things.

Personal life
Maria is reported to experience synesthesia, which leads her to see colours when she hears music. She said:

Honors
2007: Alarmprisen in the category this years Artist of the Year, for the album Fortress Round My Heart
2008: Spellemannprisen in the category this years Newcomer, for the album Fortress Round My Heart
2008: By:Larm prisen 
2008: Nesna Kommune Kulturpris 
2009: Nordland Fylkeskommunes Kulturpris Nordland County Council Culture Award

Discography

Studio albums

Extended plays

Singles

Music videos

Band
For her first album, Fortress Round My Heart, Maria's backing band included:
Ida Maria Børli Sivertsen – vocals, rhythm guitar
Stefan Törnby – lead guitar
Johannes Lindberg – bass guitar
Olle Lundin – drums

Notes

References

External links

Times Online - Ida Maria interview
Anthony Green - Can't Be Satisfied (Live w/ Ida Maria) @ 2/9/12 El Rey Theatre Los Angeles, CA on YouTube

1984 births
Living people
People from Nesna
Musicians from Nordland
Women rock singers
Norwegian rock guitarists
Norwegian rock singers
Norwegian multi-instrumentalists
Spellemannprisen winners
21st-century Norwegian women singers
21st-century Norwegian singers
21st-century Norwegian guitarists
Melodi Grand Prix contestants
21st-century women guitarists